Antonio Cortés Heredia (born 16 April 2000), commonly known as Antoñín, is a Spanish professional footballer who plays as a forward for the Cypriot club Anorthosis , on loan from Granada CF.

Club career

Málaga
Born in Málaga, Andalusia to a Romani family, Antoñín started his career at lowly locals CD 26 de Febrero before agreeing to a four-year deal with FC Schalke 04 in July 2016. However, only days later, he returned to his previous club after failing to adapt to the new country, and joined Málaga CF in February 2017.

On 28 January 2018, Antoñín was loaned to Tercera División side CD El Palo, until June. He made his senior debut just hours later, starting in a 1–0 away loss against Loja CD.

Antoñín scored his first senior goal on 11 March 2018, netting the last of a 2–0 home success over CD Huétor Tájar. On 22 April, he scored a hat-trick in a 3–1 home defeat of UD Ciudad de Torredonjimeno, and finished the season with six goals in 15 matches.

Upon returning from loan, Antoñín was assigned to Málaga's B-team in Segunda División B. He made his first-team debut with the Blanquiazules on 21 September 2019, coming on as a second-half substitute for Juanpi in a 1–0 loss at Albacete Balompié in the Segunda División championship, and scored his first professional goal on 12 October in a 2–1 home defeat to Cádiz CF.

Granada
On 24 February 2020, Antoñín signed for La Liga club Granada CF until June 2024. He made his debut on 5 March in the second leg of the Copa del Rey semi-finals, replacing Carlos Neva for the last five minutes of a 2–1 win (elimination on the away goals rule). Following the resumption of the season after the COVID-19 break, he made his top tier debut on 12 June again from the bench in a win by the same score at home to Getafe CF; on 1 July he scored for the first time to open a 2–0 win at Deportivo Alavés, a match in which he was substituted at half time due to a yellow card.

On 2 October 2020, Antoñín returned to the second division after agreeing to a one-year loan deal at Rayo Vallecano. He made his debut as a substitute the next day, and scored the last goal of a 4–0 home win over his former club Málaga.

On 19 August 2021, Antoñín returned to Málaga on a one-year loan deal. On 25 July of the following year, he moved to Portuguese Primeira Liga side Vitória S.C. also in a temporary deal.

Career statistics

Club

References

External links
 Antoñín at Málaga CF (archived)
 
 
 

2000 births
Footballers from Málaga
Spanish Romani people
Living people
Romani footballers
Spanish footballers
Spain under-21 international footballers
Association football forwards
CD El Palo players
Atlético Malagueño players
Málaga CF players
Granada CF footballers
Rayo Vallecano players
Vitória S.C. players
Anorthosis Famagusta F.C. players
La Liga players
Segunda División players
Segunda División B players
Tercera División players
Primeira Liga players
Cypriot First Division players
Spanish expatriate footballers
Spanish expatriate sportspeople in Germany
Expatriate footballers in Germany
Spanish expatriate sportspeople in Portugal
Expatriate footballers in Portugal
Spanish expatriate sportspeople in Cyprus
Expatriate footballers in Cyprus